Nerses Varzhapetian (Armenian: Ներսէս Բ Վարժապետեան Կոստանդնուպոլսեցի) served as the Armenian Patriarchate of Constantinople between 

1874 and 1884. He oversaw the church during the Russo-Turkish War. In the aftermath of the war, he strove to convince the Sultanate that the Ottoman Armenians were still loyal to the state and that they were not trying to achieve national independence.

Controversy 
A major controversy arose over the figures submitted to the Berlin Congress. In his memorandum addressed to the Congress (subsequently used extensively by various writers) Patriarch Nerses placed the number of Armenians in Erzurum, Van (Muş and Siirt included), Sivas, Harput, Diyarbekir, and Halep at 780,000 and the number of Syrians (i.e., Assyrians , or Syriacs) and Greeks at 251,000 and 25,000, respectively, for a total of 1,056,800 Christians. The total number of Muslims in these areas, according to the patriarch, amounted to a mere 770,000, of whom only 320,000 were Turks, the rest being Kurds, Kizilbaş, and Türkmen; of course, the last two groups were also ethnically Turkic. Moreover, the patriarch gave the population of Adana as consisting of only 86,000 Muslims, as against 134,000 Christians; on the other hand, Captain Casper, the former British vice-counsul in Adana, numbered the Muslims at 327,980 and the Christians at 33,780.

See also
List of Armenian Patriarchs of Constantinople
Armenians in the Ottoman Empire
Armenian Apostolic Church

References

Armenians from the Ottoman Empire
Armenian Patriarchs of Constantinople
1837 births
1884 deaths